Last Orders is a 1996 novel by British writer Graham Swift. The book won the 1996 Booker Prize. In 2001, it was adapted for the film Last Orders by Australian writer and director Fred Schepisi.

Plot
The story makes much use of flashbacks to tell the convoluted story of the relationships between a group of war veterans who live in the same corner of London, the backbone of the story being the journey of the group from Bermondsey to Margate to scatter the ashes of Jack Dodds into the sea, in accord with his last wishes. The narrative is split into short sections told by the main characters as well as updates along the journey at Old Kent Road, New Cross, Blackheath, Dartford, Gravesend, Rochester, Chatham Naval Memorial and Canterbury Cathedral. The title 'Last Orders' not only refers to these instructions as stipulated in Jack Dodd's will, but also alludes to the 'last orders (of the day)' - the last round of drinks to be ordered before a pub closes, as drinking was a favourite pastime of Jack and the other characters.

The plot and style are influenced by William Faulkner's As I Lay Dying. In June 1996, Swift declared that it was a homage to Faulkner's book but there were various differences.

Characters
Jack Dodds: a butcher, husband of Amy. His death from cancer in St Thomas' Hospital brings together four men who take a journey to scatter his ashes.  Played by Michael Caine in the movie.

Vince Dodds: a used car salesman. Adopted son of Jack and Amy Dodds, when his biological parents (the Pritchetts) were killed during the London Blitz.  Played by Ray Winstone in the movie.

Ray 'Lucky' Johnson: an insurance clerk, who has an uncanny ability to wager on the right horses. The main narrator of the book. Fought alongside Jack Dodds in the war, who saved his life on one occasion. Was left by his wife Carol, for another man, and has a daughter Susie, who lives in Australia. Ray is attracted to Amy Dodds, wife of Jack, and the two had a relationship in the past.  Played by Bob Hoskins in the movie.

Lenny 'Gunner' Tate: Drinking buddy of Jack Dodds. The odd man in the group, who is the instigator of many conflicts. Lenny's daughter Sally had a relationship with Vince Dodds, and became pregnant, before marrying a jailbird.  Played by David Hemmings in the movie.

Vic Tucker: an undertaker/funeral director. The backbone of the group, who mediates and keeps the peace when conflicts arise. Many parallels are drawn between Jack's profession and Vic's, in that they both handle bodies.  Played by Tom Courtenay in the movie.

Amy Dodds: Jack's wife, who declines to join the men when they scatter Jack's ashes. Amy and Jack had a mentally disabled daughter, June. On the day the four men travel to Margate to scatter the ashes, Amy visits June in a Home.  Played by Helen Mirren in the movie.

Mandy Dodds: Left her home in Blackburn at age 15 and travelled to London. At Smithfield Meat Market she met Jack who offered her a job and board and lodgings in his house. She went on to marry Jack's adopted son Vince.

Awards

References

1996 British novels
English novels
Booker Prize-winning works
Novels by Graham Swift
British novels adapted into films
Novels set in Kent
Picador (imprint) books
Novels set in London
Chatham, Kent
Margate
Canterbury Cathedral
Novels with multiple narrators

ru:Последние желания (фильм, 2001)